Haeder Aboudi  (born 1986) is an Iraqi former footballer who played as a defender for Najaf FC and the Iraq national football team.

Managerial statistics

Honours

Country 
 2002 Arab Police Championship: Champions
 2006 Asian Games Silver medallist.

External links 
Profil on www.goalzz.com

1986 births
Living people
Iraqi footballers
Iraqi expatriate footballers
Najaf FC players
Expatriate footballers in the United Arab Emirates
Iraqi expatriate sportspeople in the United Arab Emirates
Amanat Baghdad players
Fujairah FC players
Asian Games medalists in football
Footballers at the 2006 Asian Games
UAE First Division League players
Asian Games silver medalists for Iraq
Association football defenders
Medalists at the 2006 Asian Games
Iraq international footballers